Misie  is a village in the administrative district of Gmina Międzyrzec Podlaski, within Biała Podlaska County, Lublin Voivodeship, in eastern Poland.

The village has an approximate population of 600.

References

Villages in Biała Podlaska County